Penelope (minor planet designation: 201 Penelope) is a large main belt asteroid that was discovered by Austrian astronomer Johann Palisa on August 7, 1879, in Pola. The asteroid is named after Penelope, the wife of Odysseus in Homer's The Odyssey. The orbital plane is tilted at an angle of 5.8° to the plane of the ecliptic.

Based upon the spectra of this object, it is classified as a M-type asteroid, indicating it may be metallic in composition. It may be the remnant of the core of a larger, differentiated asteroid. Near infrared absorption features indicate the presence of variable amounts of low-iron, low-calcium orthopyroxenes on the surface. Trace amounts of water is detected with a mass fraction of about 0.13–0.15 wt%. It has an estimated size of around 88 km. With a rotation period of 3.74 hours, it is the fastest rotating asteroid larger than 50 km in diameter.

References

External links 
 The Asteroid Orbital Elements Database
 Asteroid Lightcurve Parameters
 Asteroid Albedo Compilation
 
 

000201
Discoveries by Johann Palisa
Named minor planets
000201
000201
18790807